The 1984 Big Ten Conference baseball tournament was held at Siebert Field on the campus of the University of Minnesota in Minneapolis, Minnesota, from May 18 through 20. The top two teams from the regular season in each division participated in the double-elimination tournament, the fourth annual tournament sponsored by the Big Ten Conference to determine the league champion. Michigan won their third tournament championship and earned the Big Ten Conference's automatic bid to the 1984 NCAA Division I baseball tournament

Format and seeding 
The 1984 tournament was a 4-team double-elimination tournament, with seeds determined by conference regular season winning percentage within each division. The top seed from each division played the second seed from the opposite division in the first round.

Tournament

All-Tournament Team 
The following players were named to the All-Tournament Team.

Most Outstanding Player 
Kurt Zimmerman was named Most Outstanding Player. Zimmerman was an outfielder for Michigan.

References 

Tournament
Big Ten baseball tournament
Big Ten Baseball Tournament
Big Ten baseball tournament
College baseball tournaments in Minnesota
Baseball competitions in Minneapolis